On the Verge of Destruction 1992.1.7 Tokyo Dome Live (also known as Visual Shock Vol. 4) is a live VHS/LD released by X Japan on November 1, 1992. It contains the band's performance at the Tokyo Dome on January 7, 1992, the last with Taiji Sawada on bass. The video was re-released on DVD on September 25, 2001, there is also a two-CD version of the same name.

Track listing (DVD)
Disc one
 "Prologue ~ World Anthem" (S.E)
 "Silent Jealousy"
 "Sadistic Desire"
 "Desperate Angel"
 "Standing Sex"
 "Week End"
 "Drum Solo"
 "Guitar Solo ~ hide no Heya"
 "Voiceless Screaming"
 "Piano Solo ~ Swan Lake"
 "Es Dur no Piano Sen"
 "Unfinished"

Disc two
 "Celebration"
 "Orgasm"
 "Kurenai"
 "Joker"
 "X"
 "Endless Rain"
 "Say Anything" (S.E)
 "Endless Rain" (S.E)

X Japan video albums
X Japan live albums
1992 video albums
Live video albums
1992 live albums
Albums recorded at the Tokyo Dome